Francis Norris, 1st Earl of Berkshire (6 July 1579 – 31 January 1622) was an English nobleman with the title of Earl of Berkshire.

He was the son of Captain Sir William Norreys (d. 1579) and Elizabeth Morison, daughter of Sir Richard Morrison of Cassiobury, Hertfordshire, and was born at Wytham in Berkshire (now Oxfordshire). He married Bridget de Vere, although they later separated. The marriage gave Norris access to Bridget's uncle Sir Robert Cecil who was at the heart of the Elizabethan government.  Their only issue was Elizabeth Norris.

He held the titles Baron Norris of Rycote, 1st Viscount Thame and 1st Earl of Berkshire. He was sent to Fleet Prison after attacking Lord Scrope in front of the House of Lords. He shot himself with a crossbow on 29 January 1622 and died two days later on 31 January. His estates and titles became forfeit to the crown. His daughter was later given his barony. His illegitimate son Francis was knighted and appointed High Sheriff of Oxfordshire in 1636.

He was buried at Dorchester, Oxfordshire.

Notes

References
 

1579 births
1622 deaths
Earls of Berkshire
2
People from Vale of White Horse (district)
16th-century English nobility
17th-century English nobility
Francis
Inmates of Fleet Prison
Suicides by firearm in England
British politicians who committed suicide
17th-century suicides